Scooter was an animated character used by Fox Sports during Major League Baseball games.  The character, a baseball with human facial characteristics, is voiced by Tom Kenny (best known for his work as the voice of SpongeBob SquarePants) and was designed by Fox to explain different types of pitches with the education of children in mind.

Critical reaction
Scooter debuted in the 2004 baseball season on April 16, during a game between the New York Yankees and Boston Red Sox.  While Fox Sports television chairman David Hill called Scooter "really cute and really terrific," the character garnered few positive reactions otherwise, with Sports Illustrated writer John Donovan warning: "purists everywhere, grab the barf bag," and Sports Illustrated media writer Richard Deitsch using Scooter as an example of "how technology does not always help society." The Sporting News reported polling their staff with the question "What best summarizes your feelings for Scooter, FOX's talking baseball?", and 45% of respondents chose the answer "Send him to a slow, painful death." Despite the negative reactions, Scooter would still be used in televised baseball games until after the 2006 World Series.

Peter Puck comparisons
Some television historians have noticed the similarities between Scooter and Peter Puck, an animated hockey puck that was used by Hockey Night in Canada and NHL on NBC in the 1970s to explain the rules of hockey to viewers. However, Peter Puck was well loved by viewers and is often looked at with nostalgia, whereas Scooter has been met with little but derision.

References

External links
 Hoverboard
Article on Scooter

Fictional balls
Mascots introduced in 2004
Major League Baseball on Fox